Pram Town is the third studio album by British singer-songwriter Darren Hayman and his second with his backing band the Secondary Modern.  It was released by the Track & Field Organisation on 26 January 2009. It is the first part of his "Essex Trilogy".

Track listing
 "Civic Pride" – 2:30
 "Pram Town" – 2:55
 "Compilation Cassette" – 3:39
 "Losing My Glue" – 3:06
 "No Middle Name" – 3:26
 "Room to Grow" – 3:21
 "Our Favourite Motorway" – 4:36
 "Out of My League" – 4:29
 "Amy and Rachel" – 4:02
 "Fire Stairs" – 4:41
 "Leaves on the Line" – 3:58
 "High Rise Towers in Medium Size Towns" – 4:30
 "Never Want to be That Way Again" – 3:00
 "Big Fish" – 4:25

References

2009 albums
Darren Hayman albums